Henri Thiriet aka Henry Thiriet (1873-1946) was a prolific French poster artist, book illustrator and painter. Although responsible for many memorable posters, almost nothing is known about Thiriet's life and career. He painted in a flamboyant Art Nouveau style, using its characteristic curves and swirls, and a colourful palette to create imagery bearing his clear stamp. Bicycles and their manufacturers are a recurring subject in his work, and the majority of his posters were designed for Omega, Griffiths and Dayton Cycles.

References

External links

French poster artists
19th-century French painters
French male painters
20th-century French painters
20th-century French male artists
Book artists
French illustrators
1873 births
1946 deaths
Art Nouveau painters
Art Nouveau illustrators
People from Épinal
19th-century French male artists